Neil Andrew Nicholson (born September 12, 1949) is a Canadian retired professional ice hockey defenceman who played in the National Hockey League for the Oakland Seals and New York Islanders.

Career statistics

Regular season and playoffs

External links
 

1949 births
Living people
Canadian expatriate ice hockey players in Switzerland
Canadian ice hockey defencemen
Dallas Black Hawks players
Fort Worth Wings players
Fort Worth Texans players
Ice hockey people from New Brunswick
London Knights players
Moncton Alpines (AHL) players
New Haven Nighthawks players
New York Islanders players
Oakland Seals draft picks
Oakland Seals players
Sportspeople from Saint John, New Brunswick
SCL Tigers players